+'Justments (pronounced: add justments) is the third studio album by American soul singer-songwriter and producer Bill Withers, released in 1974 by Sussex Records.  It contains the hit single, "The Same Love That Made Me Laugh" (US #50, Canada #39), which charted during the spring of 1974.

Reception

The album cover shows Withers writing the following explanation of the title:
 
Life like most precious gifts gives us the responsibility of upkeep. We are given the responsibility of arranging our own spaces to best benefit our survival. We have the choice of believing or not believing in things like God, friendship, marriage, love, lust or any number of simple but complicated things. We will make some mistakes both in judgement and in fact. We will help some situations and hurt some situations. We will help some people and hurt some people and be left to live with it either way. We must then make some adjustments, or as the old people back home would call them, + 'JUSTMENTS.

The album features José Feliciano playing guitar on "Can We Pretend" and congas on "Railroad Man". Withers was a guest musician and composer on the 1973 Feliciano album Compartments.

Legal tussles between Withers and Sussex prevented further recording sessions until Columbia signed the singer a year later. Columbia bought Withers' back catalog, re-releasing his earlier hit records, but +'Justments was not reissued on CD until 2010.

Track listing

Personnel 
 Bill Withers – lead and backing vocals, guitar (2, 9), acoustic piano (4), electric piano (5, 6, 9)
 Benorce Blackmon – guitar (1)
 José Feliciano – guitar (7), congas (10)
 Ray Jackson – electric piano (1, 2)
 John Barnes – acoustic piano (1, 3), electric piano (4)
 John Myles – electric piano (7, 8, 10), clavinet (10), string arrangements 
 Melvin Dunlap – bass (1, 2, 4, 5, 6, 7, 9, 10)
 James Gadson – drums (1, 2, 4, 5, 6, 7, 9, 10)
 Chip Steen – congas (5, 10)
 Dorothy Ashby – harp (2, 3, 4, 7)

Production 
 Bill Withers – producer 
 Melvin Dunlap – producer 
 James Gadson – producer 
 Phil Schier – engineer
 Bobby Thomas – engineer
 Carl Overr – art direction 
 John Van Hamersveld – design
 Norman Seeff – photography 
Studios
 Recorded at Record Plant (Los Angeles, CA) and Dijobe Sound (Orange, CA).
 Mastered at Artisan Sound Recorders (Hollywood, CA).

Charts

Singles

External links
 Bill Withers - + 'Justments at Discogs

References

1974 albums
Bill Withers albums
Sussex Records albums